The GWR 1854 Class was a class of  steam locomotives designed by William Dean and constructed at the Swindon Works of the Great Western Railway. The class used similar inside frames and chassis dimensions to the 1813 Class of 1882-4. In this they differed from the intervening 1661 Class, which had reverted to the double frames of the Armstrong era. Thus the 1854 Class belongs to the "mainstream" of GWR  classes that leads towards the larger GWR pannier tanks of the 20th century.

Production
The 120 1854s were built in six batches between 1890 and 1895:

Rebuilding
The engines were rebuilt during their working lives with various forms of boiler and saddle tanks, and they were also rebuilt as pannier tanks between 1909 and 1932 as Belpaire fireboxes were fitted. Most of the class worked in the GWR's Southern Division, the majority of them in South Wales. Two examples were to be found in the GWR London Division at time of nationalisation.  Numbers 907 and 1861 were allocated to 81E (Didcot) in August 1950. All achieved , and 23 of the class passed into British Railways stock in 1948, the last of them being withdrawn in 1951.

Accidents and incidents
On 3 September 1942 a Luftwaffe Ju 88 aircraft attacked the area around Castle Cary station and goods yard. No. 1729 was hit by a bomb, killing the driver. Another bomb hit a signal box, killing the signalman. No. 1729 was later scrapped, and was one of two GWR locomotives damaged beyond repair in Britain during World War II. The other was GWR 4900 Class No. 4911 Bowden Hall.

References

Sources

1854
Steam locomotives of Great Britain
0-6-0T locomotives
Railway locomotives introduced in 1890
Standard gauge steam locomotives of Great Britain
Scrapped locomotives
Freight locomotives